This is the complete list of (physical and digital) number-one albums sold in Finland in 2010 according to Finland's Official List composed by Suomen Ääni- ja kuvatallennetuottajat ÄKT (since late August 2010, known as Musiikkituottajat – IFPI Finland).

The best-performing artist was Finnish singer Jenni Vartiainen with her second studio album Seili, spending 12 weeks on the top spot. The second-best chart performer was Finnish singer Anna Puu with her second studio album Sahara spending 8 weeks atop the chart. Other major chart-toppers include Strike! by German The Baseballs, Kunnes joet muuttaa suuntaa by Finnish Maija Vilkkumaa and The Final Frontier by English Iron Maiden (all with three weeks atop the chart).

However, the top 10 list of the best-selling 2010 albums in Finland was the following:

Chart history

See also
List of number-one singles of 2010 (Finland)

References

Number-one albums
Finland
2010